Tate House, also known as The Cedars, is a historic home located at Morganton, Burke County, North Carolina.  The core was built about 1850, and is a two-story, three bay, brick mansion with a center hall plan in the Greek Revival style.  It was remodeled in the Second Empire style in 1868, with the addition of a mansard roof and large three-story octagonal tower.  It was the home of Samuel McDowell Tate (1830–1897), who undertook the 1868 remodeling.

It was listed on the National Register of Historic Places in 1973.

References

Houses on the National Register of Historic Places in North Carolina
Greek Revival houses in North Carolina
Second Empire architecture in North Carolina
Houses completed in 1868
Houses in Burke County, North Carolina
National Register of Historic Places in Burke County, North Carolina